The shortlisted nominees for the 2010 Governor General's Awards for Literary Merit were announced on October 13, and winning titles were announced on November 16. Each winner will receive a cheque for $25,000 and a leatherbound copy of their book.

English

French

References

External links
Governor General's Awards

Governor General's Awards
Governor General's Awards
Governor General's Awards